Double exponential may refer to:
 A double exponential function
 Double exponential time, a task with time complexity roughly proportional to such a function
 2-EXPTIME, the complexity class of decision problems solvable in double-exponential time by a deterministic Turing machine.
 Double exponential distribution, which may refer to:
 Laplace distribution, a bilateral exponential distribution
 Gumbel distribution, an iterated exponential distribution
 Double exponential integration, most commonly tanh-sinh quadrature
 Double exponential smoothing